José Ángel 'Cuco' Ziganda Lakunza (born 1 October 1966) is a Spanish football manager and former player who played as a centre-forward. He is the current manager of SD Huesca.

He played 381 La Liga matches over the course of 12 seasons (111 goals scored), representing Osasuna and Athletic Bilbao.

Ziganda started working as manager in 2005, and eventually coached both clubs.

Playing career
Ziganda was born in Larraintzar, Navarre. A product of CA Osasuna's youth ranks, he first appeared for his hometown's first team on 13 December 1987, in a 0–0 home draw against CE Sabadell FC. An undisputed starter through 1989 to 1991, he scored 11 La Liga goals apiece over those seasons, thus attracting attention from neighbours Athletic Bilbao.

At Athletic since the start of 1991–92, Ziganda netted 17 times in three separate campaigns, most notably a hat-trick at Albacete Balompié on 26 May 1993 in a 5–4 win. He helped the Basque side achieve a fifth place in 1994.

Ousted from Bilbao due to the emergence of Ismael Urzaiz, Ziganda returned to Osasuna in 1998, helping the club achieve promotion in 2000 and retiring after another top-flight season. For his career he scored 111 league goals, 19 in the second division, nine in the UEFA Cup and six in the Copa del Rey.

Ziganda played two games for the Spain national team, his first cap consisting of four minutes in a 2–0 friendly loss against Romania in Cáceres, on 17 April 1991.

Coaching career
Ziganda managed several of Osasuna's youth teams, including the reserves in 2005–06 and, after Mexican Javier Aguirre (also a former club player) left Pamplona for Atlético Madrid, he became the head coach of the main squad.

In that first season, with the team having already been eliminated in the third qualifying round of the UEFA Champions League, they experienced several league setbacks. However, the domestic situation gradually became better and they also reached the semi-finals of the UEFA Cup, establishing a new club record. In the following campaign, a 17th-place finish befell.

On 13 October 2008, as Osasuna failed to win a single game from six into the new season, scoring just two goals, Ziganda was sacked, being replaced by José Antonio Camacho. In early July 2009, he became Xerez CD's new manager after the Andalusians had just attained a first-ever promotion to the top tier, replacing Hércules CF-bound Esteban Vigo and signing a one-year contract. On 12 January 2010, as the team ranked last with just seven points from 17 matches, he was relieved of his duties.

In July 2011, former Athletic Bilbao teammate Josu Urrutia was elected as president of the club, and one of his first acts was to bring in Ziganda (who had been out of work for 18 months) as coach of the reserves. He managed to lead them to promotion in 2015 via the play-offs, returning to the second tier after a 19-year absence.

Ziganda's side was eventually relegated at the first attempt, after ranking in 22nd and last position. During his stint, several players made the step up to the main squad, including Yeray Álvarez, Kepa Arrizabalaga, Iñigo Lekue, Unai López, Sabin Merino, Enric Saborit, Mikel Vesga and Iñaki Williams.
 
On 24 May 2017, it was confirmed that Ziganda would succeed the departing Ernesto Valverde as Athletic's first-team manager, on an initial two-year contract. On 29 November, he oversaw a shock defeat to SD Formentera – a club experiencing their first-ever season in the third tier – in the opening round of the domestic cup, conceding the critical goal in stoppage time at the end of the second leg when a goalless draw would have been sufficient to progress.

In May 2018, with the side in 14th position in the league table (although not threatened by relegation) and having lost both legs of their Europa League last-16 tie to Olympique de Marseille, the club announced via a press conference that Ziganda would not continue in his position beyond the end of the campaign. The final total of ten league wins and 16th place in the table represented one of the poorest domestic seasons in the history of the organization.

On 18 February 2020, Ziganda was hired at Real Oviedo for the rest of the second-division season, with the option of a further year. He succeeded Javi Rozada, who was dismissed with the Asturians in the relegation zone.

On 8 June 2022, Ziganda announced his departure from Oviedo in a press conference, after his contract expired. Five days later, he took over fellow second-tier side SD Huesca.

Managerial statistics

References

External links

Athletic Bilbao manager profile

1966 births
Living people
People from Ultzamaldea
Spanish footballers
Footballers from Navarre
Association football forwards
La Liga players
Segunda División players
Segunda División B players
Tercera División players
CA Osasuna B players
CA Osasuna players
Athletic Bilbao footballers
Spain international footballers
Basque Country international footballers
Spanish football managers
La Liga managers
Segunda División managers
Segunda División B managers
CA Osasuna managers
Xerez CD managers
Athletic Bilbao B managers
Athletic Bilbao managers
Real Oviedo managers
SD Huesca managers